Shellharbour Anglican College (commonly referred to as its initials SAC or sometimes called “The Underworld”) is an Anglican school operated by the Sydney Anglican Schools Corporation. It opened in 2004 and accommodates pupils from prep to Year 12 in 2009. The college operates in new, mostly permanent buildings in a semi-rural setting off Shellharbour Road, Dunmore. The school is located on the outskirts of Shellharbour City, New South Wales, Australia. Shellharbour Anglican College currently has over 750 students.

History 

The college opened in 2004. The first day of school was held in a local church, due to the buildings being deemed by the council to be not ready for occupation.  The college opened at the site the following day and began operations. The college has since excelled each year with a new grade being added every year, reaching Year 12 in 2009. From a simple beginning of 93 students, 10 staff members, and 2 buildings, to a current population of 740 students, 65 teachers, 18 buildings.  The college has been approved as an asthma friendly school, and upholds a healthy canteen scheme to better encourage healthy eating in the student population. The college holds a Christian community spirit helping both inside and outside the boundaries of the college, raising funds in the Red Cross door knock, and contributing to many charities through various events and special days.

Statistics show that on average students have performed better than the rest of the state in the school certificate, NAPLAN, ELLA, SNAP, and Basic Skills.

Pastoral care 

The pastoral care program is structured through the following means to strive for the above ideals.

Tutor groups
Each student is in a tutor group of 15–18 students with a tutor who is the main person responsible for their pastoral care. The Tutor Group meets regularly to enable the tutor to get to know each member of their group very well through a wide range of activities such as informal conversations, diary inspections, devotions, discussion of important issues, games, group celebrations and much more. In this way a tutor builds rapport with the members of their group and is able to guide them, correct them, and positively affirm them on a regular basis.

Head of House
The Head of House has a special role in the area of pastoral care in looking after the welfare of the students in their House group. They provide an important channel of communication between the student and classroom teacher and home and school and also focus on the particular needs of the whole House group.

Outdoor education
The college's Outdoor Education Program continues to be developed with a very strong focus on challenge and overcoming fears, friendship, teamwork and support of others. Students from Years K – 12 will be engaged in Outdoor Education and it is considered an integral part of our Pastoral Care system. For these reasons it is an optional activity for all students to save stress Year 11 will follow a modified program during the period that Years 5 to 6 are participating in Outdoor Education.

The 'House' system
The ‘House’ system is strongly linked to Tutor groups and students are encouraged to find ways to be involved in a wide range of co curricular activities including sport, music, drama and public speaking. Each House has a staff member to coordinate, staff assigned to assist and senior leaders to organise and enthuse students. The aim of House activities is to enable students to feel they belong and can contribute in a variety of ways to the success of their house and to build house and school spirit.

The house names have been produced from four contemporary Christian Australians who have made a valuable contributions to society. The Houses are Allen, Booth, Chapman, and Chiswell. Named from Carol Allen, Brian Booth, John Chapman, and Nicky Chiswell.

References

External links
Sydney Anglican Schools Corporation Website
Shellharbour City Centre Anglican Church Website

Anglican primary schools in New South Wales
Educational institutions established in 2004
Anglican secondary schools in New South Wales
Anglican Diocese of Sydney
Schools in Wollongong
City of Shellharbour
2004 establishments in Australia